Sigappukkal Mookkuthi is a 1979 Indian Tamil language film, directed by Valampuri Somanathan, starring Sridevi in the lead role. Kamal Haasan and Vijayakumar play other prominent roles.

Plot

Cast 
 Kamal Haasan
 Sridevi
 Vijayakumar
 Pandari Bai
 S. V. Subbaiah
 Roja Ramani
 Sumathi

Production 
For one sequence, Sridevi dressed up as the goddess Lakshmi.

Soundtrack 
The music composed by M. S. Viswanathan and lyrics for all songs were written by Kannadasan.

References

External links 
 

1970s Tamil-language films
1979 films
Films scored by M. S. Viswanathan
Indian black-and-white films